Yekaterina Vladimirovna Dyachenko (also known as Ekaterina Diatchenko, born 31 August 1987) is a Russian sabre fencer. Dyachenko represented Russia at the 2008 Summer Olympics in Beijing, where she competed in two sabre events.

She is the daughter of fencing coaches Vladimir and Natalya Dyachenko and the sister of Aleksey Dyachenko, who won the bronze medal as a member of the Russian team in the men's team sabre at the 2004 Summer Olympics in Athens, Greece.

Career
In the women's individual sabre at Beijing 2008, Dyachenko first defeated Japan's Madoka Hisagae in the table of 32, before losing out her next match to Ukraine's Olena Khomrova, with a sudden death score of 14–15. Few days later, she joined with her fellow fencers and teammates Ekaterina Fedorkina, Elena Nechaeva and Sofiya Velikaya for the women's team sabre. Dyachenko and her team won the fifth place match against the Polish team (led by Aleksandra Socha), with a total score of 45 touches.

References

External links

 
  (archive)
  (archive)
 
 
 

1987 births
Living people
Sportspeople from Saint Petersburg
Russian female sabre fencers
Olympic fencers of Russia
Fencers at the 2008 Summer Olympics
Fencers at the 2016 Summer Olympics
Olympic gold medalists for Russia
Olympic medalists in fencing
Medalists at the 2016 Summer Olympics
Universiade medalists in fencing
Universiade bronze medalists for Russia
Medalists at the 2013 Summer Universiade